Tama Drums, (from Japanese:  (Kanji),  (Kana), read as ) is a brand of drum kits and hardware manufactured and marketed by the Japanese musical instrument company, Hoshino Gakki. Tama's research and development of products, along with production of its professional and most expensive drums, is done in Seto, Japan, while its hardware and less expensive drums are manufactured in Guangzhou, China. Hoshino has several offices around the world for marketing and wholesale distribution. Drums destined for the U.S. market are assembled and stocked at Hoshino (U.S.A.) in Bensalem, Pennsylvania. The U.S. subsidiary also contributes to Tama's market research and development.

History 
Hoshino Gakki began manufacturing drums in 1961 under the name "Star Drums". Hoshino, the family name of the founder, translates to "star field," thus the selection of the "Star Drums" brand name. The drums were manufactured at Hoshino's subsidiary, Tama Seisakusho, which had opened in 1962 to manufacture Ibanez guitars and amplifiers. While the production of guitars and amps was moved out of the factory by 1966, the production of drums there continued to grow. The two higher lines of drum models, Imperial Star and Royal Star, were introduced to the American market and were successful lower-cost drums competing against more expensive American-made drums offered by Rogers, Ludwig, and Slingerland at the time.

By 1974, Hoshino decided to make a concerted effort to make high-quality drums and hardware and start marketing its drums under the Tama brand. Tama was the name of the owner's wife, and is also a homophone with the Japanese word meaning "jewel". "Star" continues to be used in the names of Tama's drum models to this day.

Tama and Drum Workshop (DW) jointly bought the bankrupt Camco Drum Company. As part of the deal, DW received the Camco tooling and manufacturing equipment while Tama received the Camco name, designs, engineering and patent rights.

At the time, Camco was producing what was thought to be the best drum pedal on the market. DW continued production of the pedal using the original tooling, rebadging it as the DW5000. Tama began production of the same pedal under the Camco name. The Tama version of the Camco pedal is commonly referred to as the Tamco pedal to distinguish it from an original Camco pedal. Tama integrated all the engineering from Camco into their production process and the overall level of quality of their drums increased virtually overnight. The original plan was to market the low-end Tama drums to beginners and use the Camco brand to sell high-end drums to professional musicians. However, even the professionals were starting to use the Tama drums because of the low cost of the Asian-made drums with the (now) high quality of hardware.

Tama was one of the first companies to offer super heavy-duty hardware, and drum mounting systems that did not intrude into the shell like most brands in the 1970s. They also invented unique tubular drums called Octobans. Octobans are 6-inches in diameter and are manufactured in eight different lengths (hence the prefix "octo-") up to 600mm (23.62 in). They vary in pitch by using different shell lengths, rather than widths.

Notable artists 
Musicians that use or have used Tama drums include:

 Bill Bruford (Yes, Genesis, King Crimson)
 Phil Collins (Genesis, Brand X)
 Carl Palmer (Atomic Rooster, Emerson, Lake & Palmer, Asia)
 Frank Beard (ZZ Top) 
 Hans Bathelt (Triumvirat)
 Neil Peart (Rush)
 Chester Thompson (Genesis, Phil Collins)
 Alan White (Yes)
 Adrian Erlandsson (The Haunted, Cradle of Filth, Paradise Lost)
 James Cassells (Asking Alexandria)
 Nameless Ghoul (Ghost)
 Billy Cobham
 Peter Erskine
 Kenny Aronoff
 Tim Alexander (Primus)
 Chad Szeliga (Black Star Riders, Breaking Benjamin, Switched, Black Label Society)
 John Dolmayan (System of a Down)
 Chad Butler (Switchfoot)
 Taylor Gordon (The Pocket Queen)
 Dave Lombardo (Slayer)
 Joey Castillo (The Bronx, Wasted Youth, Danzig, Queens Of The Stone Age, Eagles Of Death Metal)
 John Stanier (Battles, Helmet)
 Bill Ward (Black Sabbath)
 Roger Taylor (Duran Duran)
 Lars Ulrich (Metallica) 
 Charlie Benante (Anthrax) 
 Troy Luccketta (Tesla)
 Randy Castillo (Ozzy Osbourne) 
 Jack Bevan (Foals)
 Abe Cunningham (Deftones)
 Stewart Copeland (The Police) 
 Jukka Nevalainen (Nightwish)
 Mika Karppinen (HIM)
 Yoshiki (X Japan)
 Dave Mackintosh (DragonForce)
 Peter Wildoer (Darkane)
 Paul Mazurkiewicz (Cannibal Corpse)
 Mike Portnoy (The Winery Dogs, Adrenaline Mob, Dream Theater, Avenged Sevenfold) 
 Jason Rullo (Symphony X)
 Brann Dailor (Mastodon)
 Blake Richardson (Between the Buried and Me)
 Simon Phillips (Toto)
 Brandon Barnes (Rise Against)
 Jason Costa (All That Remains)
 Nick Oshiro (Static-X, Seether)
 Shannon Lucas (The Black Dahlia Murder)
 Jackie Barnes (Jimmy Barnes, The Lachy Doley Group)
 Dean Butterworth (Good Charlotte)
 Scott Travis (Judas Priest, Racer X)
 Longineu W. Parsons III
 Mario Duplantier (Gojira)
 Steve Jansen (Japan)
 Scot Coogan (Ace Frehley, Lita Ford)
 Neil Peart (Rush) 
 Christoph Schneider (Rammstein)
 Clive Burr (Iron Maiden)
 Steve Felton (Mushroomhead)
 Nick Menza (Megadeth) 
 Jason Bittner (Shadows Fall)
 Dave Grohl (Nirvana, Foo Fighters)
 Jeremy Spencer (Five Finger Death Punch)
 Dominic Howard (MUSE)
 Elvin Jones
 Liberty DeVitto (Billy Joel)
 Vinnie Paul (Pantera)
 Taylor Hawkins (Foo Fighters)
 Don Henley (Eagles)
 John Panozzo (Styx)
 Pat Torpey (Mr. Big)
 Joe X. Dube (STARZ)
 Austin Archey (Lorna Shore)
 Daniel Wilding (Carcass)

References 

 "Tama's commitment to brand integrity" Music Trades magazine, Nov. 2007
 "The Tama Drum Guide", blurb published, 2010.

External links 

 

Musical instrument manufacturing companies of Japan
Companies based in Aichi Prefecture
Manufacturing companies established in 1974
Percussion instrument manufacturing companies
Japanese brands
1974 establishments in Japan